Oryporan is an extinct genus of procolophonid from the Early Triassic Sanga do Cabral Formation of Brazil. The type species is Oryporan insolitus.

References 
 

Procolophonids
Prehistoric reptile genera
Fossil taxa described in 2021